Meta-Historical is a collaborative studio album by American rapper KRS-One and fellow record producer True Master. It was released on August 31, 2010 through Fat Beats Records. Production was handled by True Master, who also served as executive producer alongside Hakim Green. It features guest appearances from Cappadonna, Dr. Oyibo and RZA. The album peaked at number 57 on the Billboard Top R&B/Hip-Hop Albums chart and number 24 on the Top Rap Albums chart in the United States.

Track listing

Personnel
Lawrence "KRS-One" Parker – rap vocals
Derek "True Master" Harris – rap vocals (tracks: 7, 19), producer, mixing, executive producer
Dr. Oyibo – featured artist (track 4)
Robert "RZA" Diggs – featured artist (track 14)
Darryl "Cappadonna" Hill – featured artist (track 18)
Jose "Choco" Reynoso – engineering
Eric "E-Bass" Johnson – engineering
Hokiem Green – executive producer
Joe LaPorta – mastering

Charts

References

External links

2010 albums
KRS-One albums
Collaborative albums
Fat Beats Records albums
Albums produced by True Master